Mugur Radu Gușatu (born 19 August 1969) is a Romanian former footballer.

Gușatu spent three seasons playing for SC Heerenveen in the Dutch Eredivisie.

References

External links
 

1969 births
Living people
Romanian footballers
Association football forwards
Liga I players
Eredivisie players
Nemzeti Bajnokság I players
FC Politehnica Timișoara players
CS Universitatea Craiova players
SC Heerenveen players
MTK Budapest FC players
FC Bihor Oradea players
DSV Leoben players
Romanian expatriate footballers
Expatriate footballers in the Netherlands
Romanian expatriate sportspeople in the Netherlands
Expatriate footballers in Hungary
Romanian expatriate sportspeople in Hungary
Expatriate footballers in Austria
Romanian expatriate sportspeople in Austria
Romanian football managers
SSU Politehnica Timișoara managers